Biryuchek is a rural locality (a selo) in Semibugrinsky Selsoviet, Kamyzyaksky District, Astrakhan Oblast, Russia. The population was 552 as of 2010. There are 5 streets.

Geography 
Biryuchek is located on the Chyornaya River, 23 km east of Kamyzyak (the district's administrative centre) by road. Razdor is the nearest rural locality.

References 

Rural localities in Kamyzyaksky District